The 1952 season was the Hawthorn Football Club's 28th season in the Victorian Football League and 51st overall.

Fixture

Lightning Premiership

The lightning premiership was played between rounds 5 and 6.

Premiership Season

Ladder

References

Hawthorn Football Club seasons